Harbour Road is a road in Wan Chai North, Hong Kong. It runs largely parallel to Gloucester Road and Convention Avenue.

Notable buildings along the road
 Central Plaza
 Hong Kong Convention and Exhibition Centre
 Sun Hung Kai Centre
 Hong Kong Arts Centre
 Hong Kong Academy for Performing Arts
 Wanchai Tower
 Shui On Centre
 China Resources Building
 Australian Consulate-General, Hong Kong and Macau

See also
 List of streets and roads in Hong Kong

References

Wan Chai
Roads on Hong Kong Island